Eat are a British alternative rock band. They were active in the late 1980s and early 1990s, and then reformed in 2014.  They have released two albums on The Cure's label Fiction.  The band achieved reasonable success in the UK, but did not attract much attention abroad.

Career
The band started out playing a distinctive mixture of swamp blues, hip hop and funk, showcased on their 1989 album Sell Me A God. At this time they undertook tours of Europe with The Jesus and Mary Chain and Phillip Boa. Band tensions led to the abandonment of a second album in 1990, although they toured in October on the back of an NME single of the week, "Psycho Couch". However, a combination of internal feuds ("It got to the point where we just couldn't bear to be in the same room as each other") led to a complete split and meant that the band was effectively on hiatus from 1990 to 1992.  The band returned with a different line up, a completely different sound - of pop and psychedelia - and the album Epicure in 1993. 
Despite positive reviews, a tour in the United States with Medicine, and extensive airplay, Eat had evidently run its course, and in 1995 Dolittle left to join members of The Wonder Stuff in Weknowwhereyoulive, whilst Howard joined The Wonder Stuff's singer Miles Hunt in his new project Vent 414. 

Paul and Max Noble formed U.V. Ray who released The Suitcase EP in 1991 and subsequently T.V. Eye in 1992, who featured a pre-'Dennis Pennis' Paul Kaye on lead vocals and recorded Killer Fly (1993), featuring new recordings of two previously unreleased EAT tracks as b-sides, for Go Discs.  

Paul Noble and Louis Jones from T.V. Eye went on to form Warm Jets, while Max Noble emerges from time to time with The Blue Aeroplanes.

Eat reformed to play two back to back sell out gigs at The Half Moon, Putney, in October 2014, with Malcolm Treece, formerly of The Wonder Stuff, replacing Max Lavilla on guitar.

In December 2016, Eat released "She Cries Flowers" EP, their first new material for over 20 years.

Discography
Chart placings shown are from the UK Indie Chart.

Albums
Sell Me A God (1989) (#10)
Epicure (1993)

Singles and EPs
"Skin" (Autogift EP) (1989)
"Mr And Mrs Smack" (Plastic Bag EP) (1989)
"Tombstone" (1989)
"Summer In The City" (1989)
"Psycho Couch / Alien Detector" (1990)
"Golden Egg" (1992)
"Shame" (1992)
"Bleed Me White" (1993) UK #73
"She Cries Flowers" (2016)

Official bootlegs
Trabant Tape (1990)

References

External links
Eat biography at TrouserPress.com
Discography
Dolittle - another of Ange Dolittle's bands

English alternative rock groups
English rock music groups
English pop music groups
Fiction Records artists